Grigori Mikhailovich Kozintsev (11 May 1973) was a Soviet theatre and film director, screenwriter and pedagogue. He was named People's Artist of the USSR in 1964. In 1965 he was a member of the jury at the 4th Moscow International Film Festival. Two years later he was a member of the jury of the 5th Moscow International Film Festival. In 1971 he was the President of the Jury at the 7th Moscow International Film Festival.

Biography
Grigori Kozintsev was born in the family of a doctor, therapist and pediatrician Moisei Isaakovich Kozintsov (1859–1930) and his wife Anna Grigorievna Lurie was from a rabbinical family from Kyiv. His mother's sister was the gynecologist and scientist-physician Rose G. Lurie. The mother's brother was the dermatologist Alexander G. Lurie (1868–1954), a professor and chair of venereal skin diseases at the Kyiv Postgraduate Medical Institute (1919–1954). The parents were married in 1896 in Kyiv; in the same year, a dissertation was published in a separate edition by MD M.I. Kozintsov titled "Production of sulfuric matches in respect to sanitation" (sanitary-statistical research of sulfur-match factories Novozybkov district of the province of Chernigov, Starodub: Typography A.I. Kozintsev, 1896). MD M.I. Kozintsov also engaged in education and regional studies journalism, additionally he was author of the book "Alcoholism and the social struggle against it" (at the opening of Guardianship of sobriety, Starodub: Typography A.I. Kozintsev, 1896) and "Prince Nicholas D. Dolgorukov." (materials for the biography, Starodub: Typography A.I. Kozintsev, 1903). A number of medical works by M.I. Kozintsov for alcoholism treatment, clinic syphilitic arthropathy and other issues of clinical medicine were published in Russian and German health journals.

Kozintsev spent his early childhood in Novozybkov of Chernigov Governorate, where his father served as the district sanitary inspector, as well as a doctor of the Novozybkov girls' school and where Kozintsev entered the first grade of the Novozybkov school.

Since 1913, after moving from Novozybkov, he studied at the Kyiv-Pechersk Gymnasium, since 1915 – the 5th gymnasium in Pechersk. The father admitted patients at the commercial clinic "Kvisisana" on the Large Zhitomir Street, 19, and at a free dispensary in the surgical hospital, built by philanthropist Babushkin on the Tverskaya Street, 7. The family lived in a house number 22, Apt. 2 on Mariinsko Annunciation Street (later Saksaganskogo Street). In 1919 together with his sister Lyubov, he attended a private school-studio of painting of Aleksandra Ekster. Together with other students of the school he took part in a celebratory avant-garde design of the Kyiv streets.

The theater attracted him most of all; he began work with participation in the mural decorations of the famous spectacle of Kote Marjanishvili Fuente Ovejuna by the Spanish playwright Lope de Vega. He worked in the Solovtsov Theater. With Mardzhanov and his friends Sergei Yutkevich, Michał Waszyński and Aleksei Kapler he created a puppet theater, and then the experimental theater "Harlequin", in which he staged a play that he wrote himself, and finally carried out a street performance based on the folk play King Maximilian. In early 1920 he went to Petrograd and entered the class of Nathan Altman in the Free Art Workshops (formerly Imperial Academy of Arts (today the St. Petersburg State Academic Institute of Painting, Sculpture and Architecture named after I. Y. Repin) and at the same time directed at the Studio Theater Comic Opera, led by Kote Marjanishvili.

In December 1921, Kozintsev contributed the "Salvation in the Trousers" section to the Manifesto of the Eccentric Theater, (the other contributors were Leonid Trauberg, G. K. Kryzhitsky and Sergei Yutkevich), which was announced during a debate organized by them. In 1922, Kozintsev and Trauberg organized a theater workshop "" (FEKS), and in the same year staged an eccentric re-imagining of the play Marriage by Nikolai Gogol. For two years they staged three more plays based on their own material, and in 1924 moved their experiments in the area of eccentric comedy in film, transforming the theater workshop into the Film School FEKS.

In 1924 he began working at the film studio Sevzapkino (now Lenfilm). The Adventures of Oktyabrina (1924) – the first short film of Kozintsev and Trauberg was a continuation of their theatrical experiences based on their own script; it was an attempt to combine politics (to expose the NEPman who helped the imperialists) with outright buffoonery and according to Yury Tynyanov, "a rampant collection of tricks, which the directors amassed, starved for movies." In the second eccentric short film Mishki versus Yudenich (1925) which no longer starred variety and circus actors who joined the directors from the theater (among them was Sergey Martinson), instead the actors were students of the film school, including Sergei Gerasimov, Janina Żejmo, Andrei Kostrichkin.

The first feature film of Kozintsev and Trauberg – romantic melodrama The Devil's Wheel (1926), scripted by Adrian Piotrovsky – was already a mature work. Love for dazzling eccentricity was combined with a convincing display of urban life. In this film was established the constant creative collective of FEKS's; not including the directors, it included the cinematographer Andrei Moskvin and artist Evgeny Eney, who worked with Kozintsev during almost all of his films.

FEKS's next film, The Overcoat (1926), a film adaptation of "St. Petersburg stories" by Nikolai Gogol, became one of the masterpieces of Soviet silent cinema. A script by the famous Russian writer Yury Tynyanov helped evolve his directorial vision, expressive visual choices and eccentric, on the verge of grotesque acting of actors led to the creation of a film which was stylistically in "the manner of Gogol."

The vigorous and organized working team FEKS sought in every movie to search for a new direction, and in 1927 also released a contemporary comedy Little Brother (1927) based on their own script, and immediately followed up with the historical melodrama The Club of the Big Deed (1927), scripted by Yury Tynyanov and G. Oxman, based on the material of the Decembrist uprising. Both films enjoyed success with the audience, especially The Club of the Big Deed which the famous Russian critic Viktor Shklovsky described as "the most elegant film of the Soviet Union".

Since August 1927 Kozintsev was a teacher at the Leningrad Institute of Performing Arts, which was merged with the film school FEKS.

Starting from their first sound picture Alone (1931) which used experimental montage sound techniques, a new period began in the work of Kozintsev and Trauberg. Kozintsev worked briefly in theater, staging the plays King Lear (1941), Othello (1943) and Hamlet (1954).

Since 1944 led the director's workshop VGIK (he was a professor since 1960). Among his graduates are Eldar Ryazanov, Stanislav Rostotsky, Benjamin Dorman, Vasily V. Katanyan.

His Don Quixote (1957) became a classic film adaptation. In 1962 Kozintsev published the book Our contemporary William Shakespeare, which became the theoretical preparation for his two outstanding Shakespearean adaptations: Hamlet (1964), (Lenin Prize, 1965; Special Prize of the International Film Festival in Venice, 1964) and King Lear (1970).

In 1965–1971 Kozintsev led a directing workshop at the Lenfilm. He also wrote a historical and theoretical monograph "Deep Screen" (1971) and "Space Tragedy" (published posthumously in 1973).

He died on 11 May 1973 in Leningrad and was buried at Literatorskie Jetty of Volkovo Cemetery.

Filmography
Note: all films before 1947 are co-directed with Leonid Trauberg

References

External links

1905 births
1973 deaths
20th-century Russian screenwriters
Film people from Kyiv
Theatre people from Kyiv
Academic staff of the Gerasimov Institute of Cinematography
People's Artists of the USSR
Stalin Prize winners
Lenin Prize winners
Recipients of the Order of Lenin
Recipients of the Order of the Red Banner of Labour
Male screenwriters
Silent film directors
Jewish educators
Jewish film people
Jewish theatre directors
Jewish Ukrainian writers
Jews from the Russian Empire
Russian educators
Russian film directors
Russian Jews
Russian male writers
Russian screenwriters
Russian theatre directors
Soviet educators
Soviet film directors
Soviet Jews
Soviet male writers
Soviet screenwriters
Soviet theatre directors
Ukrainian Jews
Ukrainian Soviet Socialist Republic people